William Kenneth George (born 1945) is an American-born fluid dynamicist holding both American and Swedish citizenships. He is currently senior research investigator (professor emeritus) in the Department of Aeronautics at Imperial College London.   George is known for his research on both theoretical and experimental turbulence.

Education and career
Born in Camp Shelby, Mississippi, in 1945, George graduated from Cambridge, Maryland High School as valedictorian in 1963. He attended the Johns
Hopkins University in Baltimore, Maryland, on a Maryland State Senatorial scholarship and received his BES degree from in 1967 in engineering physics. He continued at Johns Hopkins for doctoral work and received his Ph.D. degree in mechanics under the supervision of John L. Lumley in 1971. In 1968, he joined the faculty of the Pennsylvania State University, University Park, where he held positions in both Aerospace Engineering and the Applied Research Laboratory. In 1974, he left Pennsylvania State University and joined the Department of Mechanical and Aerospace Engineering at the State University of New York at Buffalo. He was promoted to professor in 1980. George joined the Department of Applied Mechanics at the Chalmers
University of Technology, Gothenburg, Sweden, in September 2000 as professor of turbulence.  Since retiring as professor emeritus from Chalmers in 2009, he has held positions with CNRS and Ecole Central de Lille in France, Imperial College of London, and Princeton University.

WKG has authored several hundred papers, mostly on turbulence and its applications.  The number of citations of his work is measured in thousands, and his h-factor is above 30 (Numbers compiled from Google Scholar. Note that the average number of citations for papers in the leading fluids journals is less than 2.). He is known for his work on both theoretical and experimental turbulence. His contributions range from measurements in gas turbines
and automotive components to fundamental studies of turbulent shear and wall bounded flows.  Among his most significant contributions was the translation and editing in 1980-81 of WIND ATLAS FOR DENMARK, which provided a methodology for siting wind generators and has contributed much to the increasing popularity of this technology in Europe and around the world. He has supervised 29 PhD students and a large number of MSc students, all of whom hold responsible positions as professors, researchers, or engineers in leading establishments throughout the world.  His academic descendants now extend through five generations and number more than 100.

Professor George has lectured extensively throughout the world and has presented numerous invited talks, including the 2006 AIAA Fluid Dynamics meeting, the 2003 American Physical Society/Division of Fluid Dynamics meeting, and the 2001 Australasian Fluid Mechanics meeting, among others..  Among his fellowships, honors and awards, the most recent are the 2008 Freeman Scholar Award from the ASME, the 2008 DCAMM scholar award from the Danish Center for Applied Mathematics and Mechanics, and the Ph.D. Supervisor of the Year award from Chalmers University in 2006. He was also a distinguished research fellow of the British Royal Engineering Academy and CNRS. Together with a former student and grandstudent, he received the
Robert T. Knapp Award from the ASME Fluids Engineering Division 2002 for the best paper in 2001. He has been a Fellow of the American Physical Society since 1988.   He is also a Fellow of the ASME and an Associate Fellow of the AIAA.  From 2010 to 2012 he was named by the EU as Marie Curie Professor at Imperial College of London, and since has retained an appointment there as senior research investigator. For the academic year 2013-2014 he was William R. Kenan Jr Professor of Distinguished Teaching at Princeton University.

George (Bill) has a wife, April Howard, and two children, Robert (deceased) and Tony.  His hobbies have varied throughout his career.   After moving to Buffalo in 1974 he became an avid skier and sailor.  When a broken back in 1983 left him with a partially paralyzed leg and ended his beloved cross-country skiing, he took up down-hill skiing and dog-sledding. And while his children were small, for about a decade in the 1980s they managed a small farm with over 100 animals including cows, pigs, chickens and goats.  He also holds an Amateur Extra ham radio license.  After winning several local trophies for racing a Shark 24 sailboat in the late 1980s, he trained to become an off-shore sailor in the early 1990s.  In 1995, he and April (both
licensed USCG captains) completed a transatlantic in their sailboat, a Vancouver 42  named WINGS.  Since then they have sailed extensively throughout Northern Europe, often with PhD students aboard. Frequently they have lived aboard ship, including the first year when moving to Sweden and during visiting academic appointments, and most recently at St. Katharines Dock and Limehouse Basin in London.  Since 2011 they have split their time between Europe and the 1929 home they inherited in Cambridge, Maryland, but have converted into a true Zero Energy Home powered entirely by the sun.

Honors and awards
George has been a fellow of the American Physical Society since 1988. He is also a Fellow of the American Society of Mechanical Engineers (ASME) and an associate fellow of the American Institute of Aeronautics and Astronautics (AIAA). He is a recipient of Freeman Scholar Award of ASME in 2008 and Robert T. Knapp Award from the ASME Fluids Engineering Division 2002 for the best paper in 2001.  He was recently honored on the occasion of his 70th Birthday and a half-century of fluids research at a special meeting on turbulence at the Institute d'Études Scientifiques de Cargèse, April 20–24, 2015 in Corsica:  "Whither Turbulence and Big Data for the 21st Century".

Books
Advances In Turbulence, with Roger Arndt. Taylor & Francis (1988).

References

External links

Interview with William George, Turbulence

Living people
1945 births
Fluid dynamicists
Johns Hopkins University alumni
Pennsylvania State University faculty
University at Buffalo faculty
Academic staff of the Chalmers University of Technology
Fellows of the American Physical Society
Fellows of the American Society of Mechanical Engineers
People from Cambridge, Maryland